Oak Grove, Arkansas may refer to:
 
 Oak Grove, Carroll County, Arkansas   
 Oak Grove, Cleveland County, Arkansas   
 Oak Grove, Crawford County, Arkansas   
 Oak Grove, Hot Spring County, Arkansas  
 Oak Grove, Lonoke County, Arkansas   
 Oak Grove, Nevada County, Arkansas
 Oak Grove, Pope County, Arkansas   
 Oak Grove, Pulaski County, Arkansas   
 Oak Grove, Sevier County, Arkansas   
 Oak Grove, Washington County, Arkansas
 
or

 Oakgrove, Carroll County, Arkansas 
 Oakgrove, Perry County, Arkansas   
 Oak Grove Heights, Arkansas